Elmer W. Cart (August 11, 1891 – February 6, 1980) was a North Dakota Republican Party politician who served as a North Dakota Public Service Commissioner from 1949 to 1954.

Biography
Elmer W. Cart was born in Marion County, Iowa, in 1891. He came to North Dakota with his parents in 1906, and was educated in the public schools of that state. He also attended a course at the North Dakota Agricultural College. He married Nettie Lawson of Luck, Wisconsin, in June 1929. They had one daughter, Mary Ann. Nettie died in 1952 at age 59. He farmed in Burke County from 1915 to 1935, and owned a  farm during his time as Public Service Commissioner. He was a member of the Lutheran Church and served in the North Dakota House of Representatives from 1921 to 1926. He was elected to the North Dakota Railroad Commission in 1934 and served until 1940. The name of that commission changed to the North Dakota Public Service Commission in 1940, and he was once again elected to it in 1948. He served for one six-year term until 1954 when he was defeated in the Republican primary. Cart died on February 6, 1980, at the age of 88.

Notes

Republican Party members of the North Dakota House of Representatives
North Dakota Public Service Commissioners
1891 births
1980 deaths
People from Marion County, Iowa
People from Burke County, North Dakota
20th-century American politicians